Matthew Sheldon Porter (1858 – September 28, 1906), was an American Major League Baseball player who, for a short time in , managed and played for the Kansas City Cowboys of the Union Association.  During his 16 games as manager, his team won three games and lost 13. He inserted himself into the line-up three times, all in center field, and produced one hit, a double, in 12 at bats.

See also
List of Major League Baseball player–managers

References

External links

1858 births
1906 deaths
Baseball players from New York (state)
Major League Baseball center fielders
Major League Baseball player-managers
Kansas City Cowboys (UA) players
Kansas City Cowboys (UA) managers
19th-century baseball players